A. angustifolia may refer to:
 Aechmea angustifolia, a plant species native to Bolivia and Ecuador
 Allamanda angustifolia, a plant species native from Brazil
 Araucaria angustifolia, another plant species native from Brazil

See also 
 Angustifolia